Regine Normann (29 July 1867 – 14 August 1939) was a Norwegian school teacher, novelist and story writer.

Biography
Serine Regine Normann was born at Bø in Nordland, Norway.  She was the daughter of Mikkel Normann (1827–71) and Tina Amalie Lockert (1844–1933). Her father died when she was four years old and her mother was left with five young children. She was sent to relatives outside Harstad when she was five years old. She graduated from Olaf Berg's Higher Teacher Education School in Kristiania (now Oslo) in 1897 and was appointed a schoolteacher at Kristiania Folk School in 1901. Up until her retirement in 1932,  she worked at Sofienberg School in Oslo.

She made her literary debut in 1905 with the novel Krabvaag. Among her other novels are Stængt from 1906, Barnets tjenere from 1910, and Faafengt from 1911. She published several collections of fairy tales, including Eventyr from 1925, Nye eventyr from 1926, Nordlandsnatt from 1927, and Det gråner mot høst from 1930.

Personal life
When she was 17, she married Peder Johnsen. The marriage was unhappy and after 10 years of marriage, she left her husband.
In 1906, she was married to author Tryggve Andersen (1866–1920). Their marriage dissolved in 1913.

From 1913 to 1932 she was a board member of the Norwegian Authors' Union. She received several awards including the Petter Dass Medal (Petter Dass-medaljen) in 1932 and the King's Medal of Merit (Kongens fortjenstmedalje) in 1937. In  1939, she moved  to her farm at Skånland in Troms where she died during 1939.

References

1867 births
1939 deaths
People from Bø, Nordland
Norwegian educators
Norwegian women novelists
20th-century Norwegian writers
20th-century Norwegian women writers
Recipients of the King's Medal of Merit